Chinook Centre (formally branded as "CF Chinook Centre") is the largest shopping mall in Calgary, Alberta, Canada. The mall is operated by Cadillac Fairview.

As the largest shopping destination in Calgary, it offers a range of mid-priced retailers as well as higher-end offerings in a luxury wing anchored by Saks Fifth Avenue. Junior anchors include Sport Chek, H&M, Old Navy, and Chapters.

The centre also includes a professional tower, bowling alley, 900-seat Dining Hall, and the 16-screen Scotiabank Theatre Chinook.

The focal point of the mall is a four-storey-high rotunda, including a time capsule at the centre's axis, set to be opened on December 31, 2999.

History

In 1960, with Calgary's population and city limits rapidly expanding, the first section of Chinook Centre was opened August 16 on the site of the Chinook Drive-In Theatre and the adjacent Skyline drive-in and driving range. Designed as an open-air complex, the mall was anchored by Woodward's, Holt Renfrew, a bowling alley, and a branch of the Calgary Public Library.

In the mid-1960s, a separate mall, Southridge, was opened across the street from Chinook. Built to be a competing centre with Sears and approximately 30 other stores, Southridge operated separately until 1974, when the malls came under common ownership and an expansion was built to bridge the centres together. The new, larger mall was renamed Chinook Ridge Shopping Centre, and included a major enclosed parking structure, a movie theatre, an office tower, and a food court.

In the 1980s, a two-storey wing of specialty retailers was added leading to a new anchor store (fashion retailer Bretton's, since closed) and a new food court. This expansion brought the mall's store count to approximately 300.

A popular feature of the mall was an indoor merry-go-round, which was initially located outside the entrance to The Bay; following the 2000s renovation (see below), the attraction was relocated to the expanded food court. The construction of a pedestrian bridge from the food court required the removal of the carousel in 2018, when it was relocated to Spruce Meadows.

2000 overhaul
In the late 1990s, Chinook Centre underwent a $300 million, three-year renovation. The complex was completely rebuilt in three phases,  and added new stores for Sears, The Bay and Zellers, as well as the south parkade and theatre complex. The former Chinook Movie Theatre location, which had closed in the early 1990s and converted into a large gaming arcade, became a much-expanded food hall. The move to larger format retailers reduced the number of stores to approximately 200. This re-merchandising program was unkind to smaller, locally owned businesses who were squeezed out by the 'upscaling' of the property. Some relocated to strip malls located near Chinook for a time.

2010 expansion
On September 29, 2010, a major  2-level expansion was opened. The new wing added approximately 60 new retailers, many of which were new to the Calgary market or considered high-end luxury brand stores. The expansion increased the number of retailers to 250, and added two levels of underground parking.

Pedestrian and transit access
Until the late 2010s, pedestrian access to the mall from east of Macleod Trail was facilitated by way of a thin pedestrian bridge, an underground tunnel, and an at-grade crosswalk. Use of these three options grew after the City's CTrain station was built approximately five blocks east of the mall (a location dictated by the placement of existing rail lines). Concerns over pedestrian safety resulted in a large pedestrian bridge being constructed in the late 2010s; running more than a block, it connects the Dining Hall on the second level to 61st Avenue, which in turn takes pedestrians to the CTrain station. In late 2018, the pedestrian tunnel was closed due to safety concerns, and the new bridge allowed the removal of the at-grade crosswalk at Macleod and 61st.

Anchors
 Hudson's Bay
 Nordstrom (opened September 19, 2014, formerly Sears) - closing 2023
 Saks Fifth Avenue (opened February 22, 2018, formerly Zellers/Target/Bretton’s)
 Scotiabank Theatre Chinook (opened March 23, 2001, formerly called Paramount Theatre)
 Sport Chek
 H&M
 Old Navy
Chapters
Chinook Bowladrome

Former anchors
 Woodward's (closed 1993)
 Bretton’s (now Nordstrom)
 Sears (closed Friday October 13, 2012, replaced with Canada's first Nordstrom on September 19, 2014)
 Zellers (closed 2012, became Target on May 6, 2013 which closed in 2015)
 Target (closed Saturday, April 11, 2015, replaced with Saks 5th Avenue on February 22, 2018)

Expansion plans
CF Chinook Centre is currently working on designs to add 2.3 million square feet of retail and mixed-use space.

See also

 List of largest shopping malls in Canada
 List of shopping malls in Canada

References

External links 
 

Shopping malls in Calgary
Shopping malls established in 1960
Cadillac Fairview